Single table inheritance is a way to emulate object-oriented inheritance in a relational database.  When mapping from a database table to an object in an object-oriented language, a field in the database identifies what class in the hierarchy the object belongs to. All fields of all the classes are stored in the same table, hence the name "Single Table Inheritance".   In Ruby on Rails the field in the table called 'type' identifies the name of the class.  In Hibernate (Java) and Entity Framework this pattern is called  Table-Per-Class-Hierarchy and Table-Per-Hierarchy (TPH) respectively., and the column containing the class name is called the Discriminator column.

See also
 Object-relational mapping
 ActiveRecord (Rails)

References

External links
 Single Table Inheritance
 Single Table Inheritance in Yii
 Single Table Inheritance in Django

Database theory